Persuasion is a 1960 British television mini-series adaptation of the 1817 Jane Austen novel of the same name. It was produced by the BBC and was directed by Campbell Logan.  Daphne Slater stars as Anne Elliot, and Paul Daneman as Captain Frederick Wentworth.  The mini-series has four episodes, each half an hour in length.

According to shmoop.com, this mini-series was most likely destroyed in the BBC clean-out of the 1970s.

Cast

 Daphne Slater as Anne Elliot
 Paul Daneman as Captain Wentworth
 George Curzon as Sir Walter Elliot
 Jane Hardie as Elizabeth Elliot
 Fabia Drake as Lady Russell
 Thea Holme as Mrs. Croft
 William Mervyn as Admiral Croft
 Clare Austin as Mary Musgrove
 Edward Jewesbury as Charles Musgrove
 Jill Dixon as Louisa Musgrove
 Diane Clare as Henrietta Musgrove
 Timothy West as Charles Hayter
 Olga Lindo as Mrs. Musgrove
 Wensley Pithey as Mr. Musgrove
 Daphne Anderson as Mrs. Clay
 Derek Blomfield as Mr. Elliot
 Philip Howard as Footman
 Patricia Cree as the Honourable Miss Carteret
 Agnes Lauchlan as Dowager Viscountess Dalrymple

References

External links

 

1961 British television series endings
1960 British television series debuts
BBC television dramas
1960s British television miniseries
Television series set in the 19th century
Television series based on Persuasion (novel)